Gabe Evans is a state representative from Weld County, Colorado. A Republican, Evans represents Colorado House of Representatives District 48, which  includes parts of Weld and Adams counties including the communities of  Brighton,  Lochbuie, Fort Lupton, Todd Creek, and Platteville.

Background
Evans lives in southern Weld County, Colorado and runs his family ranch. His military service includes two years in the Virginia Army National Guard from 2007 to 2009. After that, in 2009, he earned a commission as a second lieutenant in the United States Army, while also joining and serving in the Colorado National Guard from 2009 to 2019. In the army he learned to fly UH-60 Black Hawk helicopters. He served in Operation Enduring Freedom from 2012 to 2013 and reached the rank of captain. In the Colorado Guard, he used his piloting skills to help fight wildfires and to carry out search and rescue missions. His work included being stationed at Buckley Air Force Base. He was honorably discharged in 2019.

While serving in the Colorado National Guard, in 2011 Evans joined the Arvada, Colorado Police Department. He reached the rank of lieutenant and retired in January 2022 to run for office. Evans earned a bachelor's degree in government and strategic intelligence from Patrick Henry College.

Elections
In the 2022 Colorado House of Representatives election, Evans defeated his Democratic Party and Libertarian Party opponents, winning 63.31% of the total votes cast.

References

External links
 Legislative website
 Campaign website

21st-century American politicians
Living people
United States Army aviators
Colorado National Guard personnel
American police officers
American ranchers
Patrick Henry College alumni
People from Weld County, Colorado
Year of birth missing (living people)
Republican Party members of the Colorado House of Representatives